The LFG V 59 and the LFG V 61 were single engine, twin float passenger seaplanes designed and built in Germany in 1926 by the Luft-Fahrzeug-Gesellschaft. They differed only in their engines.

Design and development
The V 59 and V 61 were both twin float seaplanes, essentially identical apart from their engines and designed to carry four or five passengers. The V 59 was powered by a  BMW IV 6-cylinder water cooled inline and the V 61 by a much more powerful,  Bristol Jupiter 9-cylinder radial. They were metal aircraft both in frame and covering, low wing monoplanes of the semi-cantilever kind with external bracing between the upper fuselage and wing and further support from below via the flat topped floats. The wings were straight tapered with rounded tips.  The fuselage was flat sided and bottomed, with windows down the side and with a braced tailplane mounted on top of it.  The rudder extended well below the keel.

Operational history
Both the V 59 and the V 61 were entered into the German Seaplane Competition, held between 12–23 July 1926 with flights along the Baltic and North Sea coasts from Warnemünde. The V 59 did not score in the technical tests but the V 61 came sixth in them whilst not completing the whole course.

Variants
V 59  BMW IV 6-cylinder water cooled inline engine. Four passengers.
V 61  Bristol Jupiter 9-cylinder radial engine.  Estimated maximum speed . Five passengers.

Specifications (V 59)

References

Floatplanes
1920s German civil aircraft
LFG V 59